A nightmare is a frightening dream.

Nightmare(s) or The Nightmare may also refer to:

Art and literature
 Mare (folklore) or nightmare, a demon of Germanic folklore
 Night Mare, a 1983 novel by Piers Anthony
 The Nightmare, a painting by Henry Fuseli
 Nightmare (Marvel Comics), a fictional supernatural being
 Nightmare (Topčić novel), a 1997 Bosnian novel by  Zlatko Topčić
 Nightmare (Brock novel), a 1932 novel by Lynn Brock
 Nightmare, a painting by Nicolai Abildgaard
 Nightmare, a horror comic from Skywald Publications
 Nightmare, a 1970 novel by Russell H. Greenan
 Nightmares!, a young adult book series co-authored by Jason Segel and Kirsten Miller
 Nightmare, a horror fiction magazine edited by John Joseph Adams

Computing and gaming 
 Nightmare (Atmosfear series), a board game
 Nightmare (Devil May Cry), a demon in the video game series Devil May Cry
 Nightmare (Dungeons & Dragons), a creature in the role-playing game Dungeons & Dragons
 Nightmare (Kirby), a villain in the video game Kirby's Adventure
 NightMare (scareware), an early scareware program
 Nightmare (Soulcalibur), a villain in the fighting game series Soulcalibur
 Nightmare, a boss in the video game The Legend of Zelda: Link's Awakening
 Nightmare, a boss in the video games Metroid Fusion and Metroid: Other M
 Nightmare, one of the antagonists of the survival horror game Five Nights at Freddy's 4
 Knight Mare, the name of a Dark-element Skylander from Skylanders: Trap Team

Film
 A Nightmare, an 1896 French short silent film directed by Georges Méliès
 Nightmare (1942 film), mystery starring Diana Barrymore
 Nightmare (1956 film), psychological thriller starring Edward G. Robinson
 Nightmare (1964 film), suspense film from Hammer Films
 Nightmare (1965 film), a Swedish thriller film directed by Arne Mattsson
 Nightmares (1979 film), Polish film directed by Wojciech Marczewski
 Nightmares (1980 film), Australian horror film directed by John D. Lamond
 Nightmare (1981 film), "video nasty" slasher film
 Nightmares (1983 film), horror film starring Emilio Estevez
 Nightmare (2000 film) (Gawi), South Korean horror film
 Nightmare (2005 film), film produced by Morgan Pehme
 Nightmare (2011 film), Chinese horror film
 The Nightmare (2015 American film), documentary by Rodney Ascher
 The Nightmare (2015 German film), drama film directed by Achim Bornhak

Music
 Nightmare (French band), a power metal band
 Nightmare (Japanese band), a visual kei rock band
 Nghtmre (born 1990), American DJ and trap producer
 Nightmare Records, an American label founded by Lance King

Albums
 Nightmare (Avenged Sevenfold album) or the title song (see below), 2010
 Nightmare (Nightmare album), by the Japanese band, 2011
 Nightmare (single album), by Dreamcatcher, 2018
 Nightmares (Architects album), 2006
 Nightmares...and Other Tales from the Vinyl Jungle, by the J. Geils Band, or the title song, 1974
 Nightmares, by From Ashes Rise, 2003
 Nightmares, by Terrorizer, 1987

EPs
 Nightmare: The Acoustic M.S.G., by McAuley Schenker Group, 1992
 ...Nightmare, by Negazione, 1987
 Nghtmre (EP), by Nghtmre, 2016
 Nightmarer, by Queens Club, 2009
 Nightmares (EP), by Omen, or the title song, 1987

Songs
 "Nightmare" (Avenged Sevenfold song), 2010
 "Nightmare" (Halsey song), 2019
 "Nightmare" (Tuesday Knight song), 1988
 "Nightmare" (instrumental), by Brainbug, 1997
 "Nightmare", by Alma from Have U Seen Her?, 2020
 "Nightmare", by Artie Shaw, 1938
 "Nightmare", by Black Sabbath from The Eternal Idol, 1987
 "Nightmare", by Crooked X from Crooked X, 2009
 "Nightmare", by Gillan from Double Trouble, 1981
 "Nightmare", by Mercyful Fate from Don't Break the Oath, 1984
 "Nightmare", by Nothing,Nowhere from Trauma Factory, 2021
 "Nightmare", by Offset and Metro Boomin from Without Warning, 2017
 "Nightmare", by Prism from Beat Street, 1983
 "Nightmare", by Tyler, the Creator from Goblin, 2011
 "Nightmare", by Venom from Possessed, 2002 reissue
 "Nightmare (Please Wake Me Up)", by John Entwistle from Whistle Rymes, 1972
 "Nightmares", by All Time Low from Last Young Renegade, 2017
 "Nightmares", by Chameleon Circuit from Still Got Legs, 2011
 "Nightmares", by Chvrches from Screen Violence, 2021
 "Nightmares", by Clipse from Hell Hath No Fury, 2006
 "Nightmares", by Ed Sheeran from No. 5 Collaborations Project, 2011
 "Nightmares", by A Flock of Seagulls from Listen, 1983
 "The Nightmare Song", a name for the Lord Chancellor's song "Love unrequited robs me of me rest" from Gilbert and Sullivan's Iolanthe, 1882

Television
 "Nightmares" (Buffy the Vampire Slayer), an episode of Buffy the Vampire Slayer "The Nightmare" (Dynasty), an episode of Dynasty "Nightmare" (1963 The Outer Limits), an episode of the original The Outer Limits series
 "Nightmare" (1998 The Outer Limits), an episode of the revived The Outer Limits series
 "Nightmare" (Supernatural), an episode of the television series Supernatural "Nightmare", an episode of The Avengers
 "Nightmare", an episode of Land of the Giants
 Nightmare, a fictional monster in the Brazilian telenovela Caminhos do Coração
 Nightmare, a robot that competed in the series BattleBots "Nightmares", an episode of the television series, Off the Air''
 "Nightmares", an episode of the television series MacGyver

People nicknamed Nightmare
 Vanes Martirosyan (born 1986), Armenian-born American boxer
 Diego Sanchez (born 1981), American mixed martial artist
 Nghtmre or Tyler Marenyi (born 1990), an American DJ and electronic dance music producer
 KSI (born 1993), a British YouTuber, boxer, and musician

See also
 Knightmare (disambiguation)
 Night terror, a sleep disorder
 Nightmare disorder, a sleep disorder
 Nightmare flip, a skateboarding trick